The Chief Commissioner's Province of Aden was the administrative status under which the former Aden Settlement (1839–1932) was placed from 1932 to 1937. Under that new status, the Viceroy of India assumed direct control over Aden, which had hitherto been administered by the government of the Bombay Presidency. The Aden Protectorate remained unaffected by this change.

Background

For nearly a century following the capture of the port of Aden by forces of the East India Company in 1839, the town and immediate surrounding area under direct British rule, known as the Aden Settlement, had been a dependency of the distant Bombay Presidency. The Settlement's indeterminate position at the southwestern end of the Arabian peninsula was bound to cause difficulties and historian R. J. Gavin points out that "Aden’s whole history since 1839 had been marked by administrative confusion and complication."  Before taking action, the chief British official at Aden, the Resident, was often required to obtain sanction from three different authorities, the Bombay Government, the Government of India (headed by the Viceroy) and the Colonial Office in London.

Matters came to a head during World War I and in 1917, the Government of India, recognising its inability to provide sufficient forces to defend Aden against invading Turkish forces, transferred military control of the Settlement to the War Office and control of the Aden Protectorate affairs to the Foreign Office. The transfer was incomplete since India retained control of affairs within the Settlement itself, something which was increasingly seen in London as an anachronism given that Aden so obviously belonged to the Middle East and the Arab world. Things dragged on however and for the next two decades the administration of Aden witnessed incessant bureaucratic wrangling between the Bombay Presidency, the Government of India, the India Office, the Colonial Office  and the War Office, "which broke through from time to time in the columns of newspapers and on to the floor of the House of Commons and the representative assemblies in India." The chief disagreement was over the division of costs between India and London, in particular regarding the sizeable defence costs of Aden Another important roadblock to the full transfer of Aden to London was the unpopularity of the Colonial Office among the well-established and powerful Indian commercial community of Aden, which was aware of the discrimination in administration against Indians in British East Africa and feared the same would happen to them if Aden was placed under the control of the Colonial Office.

Creation of the Chief Commissioner's Province

The issue gained urgency at the end of the 1920s when discussions on constitutional reforms in India began. Far-away Aden with its Arab majority could not be accommodated in a new federal India where a considerably empowered Bombay legislative assembly would remain in charge. Therefore, it was decided that, until the final status of Aden was decided, Bombay would yield its administrative control over the territory which would become a Chief Commissioner's Province under the direct control of the Viceroy. This status, which took effect on 1 April 1932, was expected to be short-lived, and one provision of the Government of India Act 1935, stated that "Aden shall cease to be a part of British India". In accordance with the Aden Colony Order, 1936, Aden became a Crown Colony under the full responsibility of the Colonial Office effective 1 April 1937. At the time, the British government had made it clear that it was unwilling to share control of such an vital imperial base or anything pertaining to it with an independent Indian administration. However, to mollify the Indian community which still opposed the transfer, links with India were not totally severed. While the District and Sessions Court of Aden became the Supreme Court of the new Colony, appeals could be made to the High Court of Judicature in Bombay in civil cases involving property and some civil rights cases, as well as in criminal cases. The Indian rupee maintained its official currency status.

Sir Bernard Reilly, who had been named Resident in 1931, then Chief Commissioner in 1932, became the first Governor of Aden Colony.

Composition of the population of Aden in 1933

Arabs 29,820 
Indians 7,287
Jews 4,120
Somalis 3,935
Europeans 1,145
Miscellaneous 331

Chief Commissioners 
For previous British ruling officers see List of British representatives at Aden
Sir Bernard Rawdon Reilly, first as resident in 1931, then as Chief Commissioner.

Views of Aden

See also 
 Postage stamps and postal history of Aden
 Aden Protectorate
 Trucial Oman
 Territorial evolution of the British Empire
 Baloch Regiment
 Robert Moresby (Survey of the Red Sea)

References 

Provinces of British India
Aden
Bombay Presidency
20th century in Yemen
1839 establishments in the British Empire
1937 disestablishments in Asia